The Canaanite religion was the group of ancient Semitic religions practiced by the Canaanites living in the ancient Levant from at least the early Bronze Age through the first centuries AD. Canaanite religion was polytheistic and, in some cases, monolatristic. Some gods and goddesses were absorbed into the Yahwist religion of the ancient Israelites, notably El (who later became synonymous with Yahweh), Baal and Asherah, until the Babylonian captivity where they worshipped God alone.

Beliefs

Deities

A group of deities in a four-tier hierarchy headed by El and Asherah
were worshiped by the followers of the Canaanite religion; this is a detailed listing:
 Aglibol, god of the moon and brother of Malakbel. Part of a trio of gods of Palmyra, Syria along with Bel and Yarhibol. Also part of another trio with Baalshamin and Malakbel. 
 Anat, virgin goddess of war and strife, sister and putative mate of Ba'al Hadad.
 Arsay, goddess of the underworld, one of the three daughters of Ba'al Hadad.
 Arsu, god of the evening star and twin brother of Azizos.
 Ashtar-Chemosh, wife of Chemosh and goddess of the Moabites.
 Asherah, queen consort of El (Ugaritic religion), Elkunirsa (Hittite religion), Yahweh (Israelite religion), Amurru (Amorite religion), Anu (Akkadian religion) and 'Amm (Religion in pre-Islamic Arabia) Symbolized by an Asherah pole in the Hebrew Bible.
 Ashima, goddess of fate 
 Astarte, goddess of war, hunting and love.
 Atargatis, wife of Hadad, goddess of fertility and the chief goddess of northern Syria 
 Attar, god of the morning star ("son of the morning") who tried to take the place of the dead Baal and failed. Male counterpart of Athtart.
 Azizos, god of the morning star and twin brother of Arsu.
 Baalah, properly Baʿalah, the wife or female counterpart of Baal (also Belili)
 Ba'alat Gebal, goddess of Byblos, Phoenicia. She was distinguished in iconography from Astarte or similar goddesses by two tall, upright feathers in her headdress.
 Ba'al Hadad (lit. master of thunder), god of storms, thunder, lightning and air. King of the gods. Uses the weapons Driver and Chaser in battle. Often referred to as Baalshamin.
 Ba'al Hermon, titular local deity of Mount Hermon.
 Baal Hammon, god of vegetative fertility and renewer of all energies of Ancient Carthage
 Baalshamin also called Baal Shamem and Baal Shamaim, supreme sky god of Palmyra, Syria whose temple was destroyed on 23 August 2015 by ISIL. His attributes were the eagle and the lightning bolt. Part of trinity of deities along with Aglibol and Malakbel.
 Baal-zephon or Baalzephon, properly Baʿal Zaphon or Ṣaphon. Alternate form of Baal Hadad as lord of Mount Zaphon.
 Bel, or Bol, was the chief god of Palmyra, Syria whose temple was destroyed on August 30, 2015, by ISIL.
 Chemosh, possibly one of the sons of El, a god of war and destruction and the national god of the Moabites and the Ammonites.
 Dagon (Dagan) god of crop fertility and grain, father of Ba'al Hadad
 El, also called 'Il or Elyon ("Most High"), god of creation, husband of Athirat. 
 Eretz, goddess of the earth
 Eshmun, god, or as Baalat Asclepius, goddess, of healing
 Gad, god of fortune
 Gupan and Ugar, messenger gods of the weather god Baal, who always appear as a pair.
 Horon, an underworld god, 
 Ishara, a goddess of Eblaite origin
 Ishat, goddess of fire, wife of Moloch. She was slain by Anat.
 Kotharat, seven goddesses of marriage and pregnancy
 Kothar-wa-Khasis, the skilled god of craftsmanship, created Yagrush and Aymur (Driver and Chaser) the weapons used by the god Ba'al Hadad.
 Lotan, the twisting, seven-headed serpent ally of Yam.
 Malakbel, god of the sun, vegetation, welfare, angel of Bel and brother of Agilbol. Part of a trinity of deities in Palmyra, Syria along with Aglibol and Baalshamin.
 Manuzi, god of weather and husband of Liluri. Bulls were sacrificed to both of them.
 Marqod, god of dance
 Melqart, "king of the city", god of Tyre, the underworld and cycle of vegetation in Tyre, co-ruler of the underworld, twin brother of Horon and son of Mot.
 Milcom, national god of the Ammonites.
 Misor, twin brother of Sydyk.
 Moloch, putative god of fire, husband of Ishat, may be identified with Milcom.
 Mot or Mawat, god of death (not worshiped or given offerings)
 Nikkal-wa-Ib, goddess of orchards and fruit
 Pidray, goddess of light and lightning, one of the three daughters of Ba'al Hadad.
 Qadeshtu, lit. "Holy One", putative goddess of love, desire and lust. Also a title of Asherah.
 Qos, national god of the Edomites
 Resheph, god of plague and of healing
 Shadrafa, god of medicine or healing
 Shachar and Shalim, twin mountain gods of dawn and dusk, respectively. Shalim was linked to the netherworld via the evening star and associated with peace
 
 Shapash, also transliterated Shapshu, goddess of the sun; sometimes equated with the Mesopotamian sun god Shamash, whose gender is disputed. Some authorities consider Shamash a goddess.
 Sydyk, the god of righteousness or justice, sometimes twinned with Misor, and linked to the planet Jupiter
 Tallai, the goddess of winter, snow, cold and dew, one of the three daughters of Ba'al Hadad.
 Yam (lit. sea-river) the god of the sea and rivers, also called Judge Nahar (judge of the river)
 Yarhibol, solar god and "lord of the spring". Part of a trinity of co-supreme gods of Palmyra, Syria along with Aglibol and Bel.
 Yarikh, god of the moon and husband of Nikkal. The city of Jericho was likely his cultic center.

Afterlife beliefs and cult of the dead
Canaanites believed that following physical death, the npš (usually translated as "soul") departed from the body to the land of Mot (Death). Bodies were buried with grave goods, and offerings of food and drink were made to the dead to ensure that they would not trouble the living. Dead relatives were venerated and sometimes asked for help.

Cosmology
None of the inscribed tablets found in 1929 in the Canaanite city of Ugarit (destroyed c. 1200 BC) has revealed a cosmology. Any idea of one is often reconstructed from the much later Phoenician text by Philo of Byblos (c. 64–141 AD), after much Greek and Roman influence in the region.

According to the pantheon, known in Ugarit as ' (Elohim) or the children of El, supposedly obtained by Philo of Byblos from Sanchuniathon of Berythus (Beirut) the creator was known as Elion, who was the father of the divinities, and in the Greek sources he was married to Beruth (Beirut = the city). This marriage of the divinity with the city would seem to have Biblical parallels too with the stories of the link between Melqart and Tyre; Chemosh and Moab; Tanit and Baal Hammon in Carthage, Yah and Jerusalem.

The union of El Elyon and his consort Asherah would be representation of primordial Cronos and Rhea in Greek mythology or Roman Saturnus and Ops.

In Canaanite mythology there were twin mountains Targhizizi and Tharumagi which hold the firmament up above the earth-circling ocean, thereby bounding the earth. W. F. Albright, for example, says that El Shaddai is a derivation of a Semitic stem that appears in the Akkadian shadû ("mountain") and shaddā'û or shaddû'a ("mountain-dweller"), one of the names of Amurru. Philo of Byblos states that Atlas was one of the Elohim, which would clearly fit into the story of El Shaddai as "God of the Mountain(s)". Harriet Lutzky has presented evidence that Shaddai was an attribute of a Semitic goddess, linking the epithet with Hebrew šad "breast" as "the one of the Breast". The idea of two mountains being associated here as the breasts of the Earth, fits into the Canaanite mythology quite well. The ideas of pairs of mountains seem to be quite common in Canaanite mythology (similar to Horeb and Sinai in the Bible). The late period of this cosmology makes it difficult to tell what influences (Roman, Greek, or Hebrew) may have informed Philo's writings.

Mythology
In the Baal Cycle, Ba'al Hadad is challenged by and defeats Yam, using two magical weapons (called "Driver" and "Chaser") made for him by Kothar-wa-Khasis. Afterward, with the help of Athirat and Anat, Ba'al persuades El to allow him a palace. El approves, and the palace is built by Kothar-wa-Khasis. After the palace is constructed, Ba'al gives forth a thunderous roar out of the palace window and challenges Mot. Mot enters through the window and swallows Ba'al, sending him to the Underworld. With no one to give rain, there is a terrible drought in Ba'al's absence. The other deities, especially El and Anat, are distraught that Ba'al has been taken to the Underworld. Anat goes to the Underworld, attacks Mot with a knife, grinds him up into pieces, and scatters him far and wide. With Mot defeated, Ba'al is able to return and refresh the Earth with rain.

Religious practices
Archaeological investigations at the site of Tell es-Safi have found the remains of donkeys, as well as some sheep and goats in Early Bronze Age layers, dating to 4,900 years ago which were imported from Egypt in order to be sacrificed. One of the sacrificial animals, a complete donkey, was found beneath the foundations of a building, leading to speculation this was a 'foundation deposit' placed before the building of a residential house.

It is considered virtually impossible to reconstruct a clear picture of Canaanite religious practices. Although child sacrifice was known to surrounding peoples, there is no reference to it in ancient Phoenician or Classical texts. The biblical representation of Canaanite religion is always negative.

Canaanite religious practice had a high regard for the duty of children to care for their parents, with sons being held responsible for burying them, and arranging for the maintenance of their tombs.

Canaanite deities such as Baal were represented by figures which were placed in shrines, often on hilltops, or 'high places' surrounded by groves of trees, such as is condemned in the Hebrew Bible, in Hosea (v 13a) which would probably hold the Asherah pole, and standing stones or pillars.

Hellenistic period 
Throughout the Hellenistic period, in the non-Jewish parts of Palestine, Greek religion grew alongside pre-existing Canaanite traditions rather than replacing them. From the ancient Canaanite practice of outdoor worship, the Greek custom of worshipping Zeus on a simple altar atop Mount Ida or Olympus cannot have appeared all that odd. The new masters conferred Greek names on the ancient Canaanite deities.

History

The Canaanites
The Levant region was inhabited by people who themselves referred to the land as 'ca-na-na-um' as early as the mid-second millennium BC. There are a number of possible etymologies for the word referred.

The Akkadian word "kinahhu" referred to the purple-colored wool, dyed from the Murex molluscs of the coast, which was throughout history a key export of the region. When the Greeks later traded with the Canaanites, this meaning of the word seems to have predominated as they called the Canaanites the Phoenikes or "Phoenicians", which may derive from the Greek word "Phoenix" meaning crimson or purple, and again described the cloth for which the Greeks also traded. The Romans transcribed "phoenix" to "poenus", thus calling the descendants of the Canaanite settlers in Carthage "Punic".

Thus while "Phoenician" and "Canaanite" refer to the same culture, archaeologists and historians commonly refer to the Bronze Age, pre-1200 BC Levantines as Canaanites; and their Iron Age descendants, particularly those living on the coast, as Phoenicians. More recently, the term Canaanite has been used for the secondary Iron Age states of the interior (including the Philistines and the states of Israel and Judah)
that were not ruled by Arameans — a separate and closely related ethnic group. The DNA of the modern Arab and Jewish people matches the DNA of the ancient Canaanites.

Influences
Canaanite religion was strongly influenced by their more powerful and populous neighbors, and shows clear influence of Mesopotamian and Egyptian religious practices. Like other people of the Ancient Near East Canaanite religious beliefs were polytheistic, with families typically focusing on veneration of the dead in the form of household gods and goddesses, the Elohim, while acknowledging the existence of other deities such as Baal and El, Mot,  Qos, Asherah and Astarte. Kings also played an important religious role and in certain ceremonies, such as the hieros gamos of the New Year, may have been revered as gods. "At the center of Canaanite religion was royal concern for religious and political legitimacy and the imposition of a divinely ordained legal structure, as well as peasant emphasis on fertility of the crops, flocks, and humans."

Carthage

Contact with other areas

Canaanite religion was influenced by its peripheral position, intermediary between Egypt and Mesopotamia, whose religions had a growing impact upon Canaanite religion. For example, during the Hyksos period, when chariot-mounted maryannu ruled in Egypt, at their capital city of Avaris, Baal became associated with the Egyptian god Set, and was considered identical – particularly with Set in his form as Sutekh. Iconographically henceforth, Baal was shown wearing the crown of Lower Egypt and shown in the Egyptian-like stance, one foot set before the other. Similarly Athirat (known by her later Hebrew name Asherah), Athtart (known by her later Greek name Astarte), and Anat henceforth were portrayed wearing Hathor-like Egyptian wigs.

From the other direction, Jean Bottéro has suggested that Ya of Ebla (a possible precursor of Yam) was equated with the Mesopotamian god Ea during the Akkadian Empire. In the Middle and Late Bronze Age, there are also strong Hurrian and Mitannite influences upon the Canaanite religion. The Hurrian goddess Hebat was worshiped in Jerusalem, and Baal was closely considered equivalent to the Hurrian storm god Teshub and the Hittite storm god, Tarhunt. Canaanite divinities seem to have been almost identical in form and function to the neighboring Arameans to the east, and Baal Hadad and El can be distinguished amongst earlier Amorites, who at the end of the Early Bronze Age invaded Mesopotamia.

Carried west by Phoenician sailors, Canaanite religious influences can be seen in Greek mythology, particularly in the tripartite division between the Olympians Zeus, Poseidon and Hades, mirroring the division between Baal, Yam and Mot, and in the story of the Labours of Hercules, mirroring the stories of the Tyrian Melqart, who was often equated with Heracles.

Sources
Present-day knowledge of Canaanite religion comes from:

 literary sources, mainly from Late Bronze Age Ugarit, supplemented by biblical sources
 archaeological discoveries

Literary sources
 
Until Claude F. A. Schaefer began excavating in 1929 at Ras Shamra in Northern Syria (the site historically known as Ugarit), and the discovery of its Bronze Age archive of clay tablets written in an alphabetical cuneiform, modern scholars knew little about Canaanite religion, as few records have survived. Papyrus seems to have been the preferred writing medium, but whereas in Egypt papyrus may survive centuries in the extremely dry climate, Canaanite records have simply decayed in the humid Mediterranean climate. As a result, the accounts contained within the Bible represented almost the only sources of information on ancient Canaanite religion. This record was supplemented by a few secondary and tertiary Greek sources: (Lucian's De Dea Syria (The Syrian Goddess), fragments of the Phoenician History of Philo of Byblos (died 141 AD), and the writings of Damascius). More recently, detailed study of the Ugaritic material, of other inscriptions from the Levant and also of the Ebla archive from Tel Mardikh, excavated in 1960 by a joint Italo-Syrian team, have cast more light on the early Canaanite religion.

According to The Encyclopedia of Religion, the Ugarit texts represent one part of a larger religion that was based on the religious teachings of Babylon. The Canaanite scribes who produced the Baal texts were also trained to write in Babylonian cuneiform, including Sumerian and Akkadian texts of every genre.

Archaeological sources

Archaeological excavations in the last few decades have unearthed more about the religion of the ancient Canaanites. The excavation of the city of Ras Shamra (1928 onwards) and the discovery of its Bronze Age archive of clay-tablet alphabetic cuneiform texts provided a wealth of new information. Detailed study of the Ugaritic material, of other inscriptions from the Levant and also of the Ebla archive from Tel Mardikh, excavated in 1960 by a joint Italo-Syrian team, have cast more light on the early Canaanite religion.

See also 
 Ancient Semitic religion
 Canaanism
 Origins of Judaism
 Religion in pre-Islamic Arabia
 Religions of the ancient Near East
 Semitic neopaganism
 The Early History of God: Yahweh and Other Deities in Ancient Israel
 Yahwism

Footnotes

References

Sources

External links

Ancient Semitic religions
Religion
Levantine mythology
Polytheism
Religion in ancient Israel and Judah
Phoenician mythology
Phoenician religion